Parazanomys is a genus of North American tangled nest spiders containing the single species, Parazanomys thyasionnes. It was  first described by D. Ubick in 2005, and has only been found in United States.

References

Amaurobiidae
Monotypic Araneomorphae genera
Spiders of the United States